The canton of Viry-Châtillon is an administrative division of the Essonne department, Île-de-France region, northern France. Its borders were modified at the French canton reorganisation which came into effect in March 2015. Its seat is in Viry-Châtillon.

It consists of the following communes:
Grigny
Viry-Châtillon

References

Cantons of Essonne